Kim Sun-a (born October 1, 1973) is a South Korean actress. She is best known for her titular role as Kim Sam-soon in the popular television series My Lovely Sam Soon (2005). Other notable series include City Hall (2009), Scent of a Woman (2011),The Lady in Dignity (2017), Should We Kiss First? (2018), Children of Nobody (2018) and Secret Boutique (2019).

Early life
Kim Sun-a was born in Daegu in 1973. She is the eldest of three siblings, with a younger brother and sister. When Kim was in middle school, her family immigrated to Japan, and she spent much of her adolescence in Chōfu, Tokyo, where she learned to speak Japanese fluently.

In 1993, Kim enrolled at Ball State University in Indiana, United States as a Piano major (she also became fluent in English).

Career
While in South Korea for summer vacation in 1996, Kim stood in for a friend in a modeling job, thus inadvertently making her entertainment debut. Despite her inexperience in show business, she left college and subsequently appeared in a Hanbul Cosmetics commercial with the slogan "I felt his scent on a strange woman," which jump-started her career. She then appeared in a music video by Kim Hyun-cheol, and in 1997 began getting cast in supporting roles on TV but did not emerge as a star. Kim would first become well known as a film actress, debuting in the big-budget box office failure Yesterday, but going on to play a lead role as a student teacher in the unexpected hit Wet Dreams. Initially Kim had considered a singing career and successfully auditioned to join Park Joon-hyung and Park Jin-young's project mixed-gender group "GOT6" in 1997 but left the following year to pursue acting. The group then became the five-piece boy band g.o.d. Kim's identity as the anonymous female singer who was originally part of "GOT6" was only revealed by Park Joon-hyung and confirmed by Kim herself in 2015.

Following her film success, Kim began to establish a niche for herself in comedies, often appearing as a straight-talking and not particularly demure comic heroine. She appeared in three films in 2003: a memorable cameo appearance in the period comedy Once Upon a Time in a Battlefield, opposite Im Chang-jung in the commercially successful The Greatest Expectation, and together with Cha Tae-hyun in the little-watched Happy Ero Christmas. In 2004 she took the lead role in S Diary as a jilted woman who decides to get revenge on her ex-boyfriends.

The early part of 2005 saw her star in the action-comedy She's on Duty,  but she would follow up by returning to the realm of TV dramas. It proved to be the best move of her career, as My Lovely Sam Soon ended up becoming the most-watched drama of 2005. The forthright, independent personality she displayed in her leading role as a woman who finds unexpected success in life as a baker endeared her to women across Korea, and later Asia, establishing her as a top star. Later that year, Kim decided to finish her college degree by transferring to Kyung Hee University as a Theater and Film major (she graduated in 2009 and received an Achievement Award from the College of Art and Design).

Her first post-Sam Soon project was supposed to have been the movie Thursday's Child, but the project ran into problems midway through filming. She won the lawsuit in 2007, with the Seoul Central District Court ruling that Kim bore no responsibility for the shutdown of the movie. After undergoing script revisions and a change of director and lead actress (to Yunjin Kim), Thursday's Child was eventually renamed and released as Seven Days.

After a three-year hiatus caused by legal and contractual disputes, Kim finally got back to work in 2008, starring in the big-screen comedy Girl Scout, and the poorly received TV drama Night After Night (also known as When It's At Night). 2009's City Hall, where she played a low-ranking city official whose life takes a turn when she wins a pageant and later becomes the mayor, was a modest hit, with fans crediting its success to Kim's chemistry with her co-star Cha Seung-won.

Originally cast as the lead actress for 2010's I Am Legend, Kim quit before filming started due to issues with the production (she was replaced by her good friend Kim Jung-eun). Instead she chose the 2011 melodrama Scent of a Woman, which centers on a spinster who, after slaving herself at a travel agency for many years, is diagnosed that she only has six months left to live, and decides to live the rest of her life happily, turning in her resignation and leaving for a vacation of luxury. She next starred in the movie Pitch High (in Korean, Fighting Spirit), in which she played the supportive wife of a second string baseball pitcher.

In the 2012 romantic comedy series I Do, I Do, Kim's character is a workaholic shoe designer who gets pregnant after a one-night stand with a much younger newbie employee, then meets a charming obstetrician. She returned to the big screen in 2013 thriller The Five, based on the popular webtoon by Jeong Yeon-shik, in which Kim played a woman who plots revenge against the serial killer who murdered her family and left her crippled (her performance later won Best Actress at the 34th Golden Cinema Festival).

In 2015, Kim was then cast in Masked Prosecutor, about a prosecutor by day who turns into a masked vigilante by night; Kim plays the chief of a detective squad in the violent crimes unit.
In October 2015, Kim signed an exclusive contract with management agency C-JeS Entertainment.

In 2017, Kim starred in the mystery thriller series The Lady in Dignity, playing a woman from a poor family whose ambition is to become a member of the upper class. The series was a commercial and critical success, becoming JTBC's highest rated drama with a single episode rating of  12.065%.
In December 2017, Kim left C-JeS Entertainment and signed with new management agency Good People Entertainment.

In 2018, Kim starred in the romance melodrama Should We Kiss First?, playing a divorced flight attendant who finds a new love, and mystery thriller drama Children of Nobody.

Personal life
In early 2008, Kim was involved in another controversy. Na Hoon-a, a successful trot singer with a career spanning over 40 years, was falsely rumored to had been castrated by yakuza, because he was having an affair with the mistress of a gang boss. The mistress was wildly guessed at, with the names of actresses Kim Hye-soo and Kim Sun-a thrown around (both issued official denials). Na ended up holding a press conference in which he almost stripped in order to prove the rumor was untrue, and demanded that the media apologize to the two actresses.

In 2015, Kim won the lawsuit she had filed against a plastic surgery clinic in Busan for breaching her publicity rights by using her name and photos in their advertising without her permission; she received ₩25 million in damages.

Filmography

Film

Television series

Music video

Musical theatre

Awards and nominations

References

External links
 
 
 

1975 births
Living people
IHQ (company) artists
King Kong by Starship artists
South Korean television actresses
20th-century South Korean actresses
21st-century South Korean actresses
South Korean film actresses
Kyung Hee University alumni
People from Daegu